The IWRG Intercontinental Lightweight Championship is a singles professional wrestling championship promoted by International Wrestling Revolution Group (IWRG) since May 2008.

The Lightweight championship is considered a secondary championship in IWRG, with the IWRG Intercontinental Heavyweight Championship being considered the primary championship of the promotion. Spider Fly is the current champion, having defeated Aster Boy on November 24, 2022 at Torneo Fill 101. Spider Fly is the 18th overall champion and the 17th person to have held the championship. The Lightweight championship was first won by Freelance in Naucalpan, Mexico when he won a 10-man elimination match. The championship has only changed hands in Arena Naucalpan on IWRG promoted shows. Only Tetsuya/Tetsuya Bushi has held the title twice, he is also the person with the shortest reign, 35 days, while Impossible has the record for the longest reign so far, 1,142 days in total.

As it is a professional wrestling championship, the championship was not won not by actual competition, but by a scripted ending to a match determined by the bookers and match makers. On occasion the promotion declares a championship vacant, which means there is no champion at that point in time. This can either be due to a storyline, or real life issues such as a champion suffering an injury being unable to defend the championship, or leaving the company.

Tournaments

November 2016

Title history

Combined reigns

Notes

References

External links
IWRG Intercontinental Lightweight Title History at Cagematch.net

International Wrestling Revolution Group championships
Lightweight wrestling championships
Intercontinental professional wrestling championships